Francis Albert Matterson (1904–1980) was an Australian rugby league player who played in the 1920s and 1930s.

Frank 'Dutchy' Matterson was a loyal player from the Western Suburbs Magpies. He played 85 games during a nine-year career at the club. Frank played for Wests between 1924-1933. He won a premiership with the club, playing in the 1930 Grand Final.

He also played for New South Wales on four occasions in 1929.

Frank 'Dutchy' Matterson died on 2 February 1980, aged 75.

References

1904 births
1980 deaths
Western Suburbs Magpies players
New South Wales rugby league team players
Australian rugby league players
Rugby league props
Rugby league players from Sydney